The 1928 United States presidential election in Nevada took place on November 8, 1932, as part of the 1932 United States presidential election. State voters chose three representatives, or electors, to the Electoral College, who voted for president and vice president.

Nevada was won by Secretary of Commerce Herbert Hoover (R–California), running with Senator Charles Curtis, with 56.54% of the popular vote, against Governor Al Smith (D–New York), running with Senator Joseph Taylor Robinson, with 43.46% of the popular vote.

Results

Results by county

See also
United States presidential elections in Nevada

References

Nevada
1928
1928 Nevada elections